is a 2001 Japanese movie directed by Sachi Hamano, based on the novel Yurisai by Houko Momotani. The film focuses on the sexuality of older women and won the Jury Prize for "Best Feature - Lesbian" at the Philadelphia International Gay & Lesbian Film Festival.

Cast and characters
Kazuko Yoshiyuki as Rie Miyano
Mickey Curtis as Terujiro Miyoshi
Utae Shoji as Umeka Mariko
Kazuko Shirakawa as Renako Yokota
Sanae Nakahara as Teruko Satoyama
Sachiko Hara as Atsuko Namiki

See also
Tokyo International Lesbian & Gay Film Festival
List of LGBT-related films directed by women

References

External links
 

 Lily Festival at Japanese Film Database

2001 films
2001 LGBT-related films
Films based on Japanese novels
Films directed by Sachi Hamano
2000s Japanese-language films
Japanese LGBT-related films
Lesbian-related films
2000s Japanese films